Martin Baltus (born 18 October 1953) is a Dutch rower. He competed in the men's coxed four event at the 1976 Summer Olympics.

References

External links
 

1953 births
Living people
Dutch male rowers
Olympic rowers of the Netherlands
Rowers at the 1976 Summer Olympics
People from Castricum
Sportspeople from North Holland